Confluphyllia is a genus of cnidarians belonging to the family Caryophylliidae.

The species of this genus are found in Australia.

Species:
 Confluphyllia juncta Cairns & Zibrowius, 1997

References

Caryophylliidae
Scleractinia genera